Drosia (Greek: Δροσιά, meaning "dew" or "coolness") is a neighbourhood in the city of Patras, Greece, 3 km east-southeast of downtown.

Streets

Andreou Papandreou Street
Damaskou Street
Kalavryton Street
Patras-Clauss Road

Information
The origin of the name comes from the centre named Drosia which used to exist in the 1970s by Aktotiriou Street and Patras-Clauss Road in which is now a square.  In the square named Kalavrytinou Olokaftomatos survives several trees under from the area which had little tables in the centre.  The avenue are filled with palm trees in the middle and has a hospital.

The area are residential to the south and west, a forest lies to the southeast, and mountains to the north.

References
The first version of the article is translated from the article at the Greek Wikipedia (el:Main Page)

Neighborhoods in Patras